Dr. Meeta Pandit is a Hindustani Classical vocalist and a leading exponent of the Gwalior Gharana. She is the granddaughter and disciple of Krishnarao Shankar Pandit and daughter of Laxman Krishnarao Pandit. She is the sixth in the unbroken lineage and the first woman in the family to have taken up music as a profession.

Early life
Meeta was born in New Delhi, India. She is the daughter of Abha Pandit, a homemaker and Pt. Laxman Krishnarao Pandit, a veteran singer of the Gwalior gharana and Sangeet Natak Akademi awardee. She spent her childhood in New Delhi, where she attended St. Mary's School until higher secondary, and earned a bachelor's degree in Commerce from Lady Sri Ram College, Delhi University.

Meeta began training with her grandfather Padma Bhushan Pt. Krishnarao Shankar Pandit and her father Pt. L.K Pandit at the age of 3. Growing up in a house where music ustads and her father's disciples visited day in and day out, and all conversations centered around music, she was exposed to the finer aspects of music from a very young age. However, as a teenager, she was encouraged by her parents to take up a more stable profession than music, primarily due to the irregular working hours and solo travels involved, making it a difficult career choice for a woman. Her elder brother Tushar Pandit was in fact, being groomed to take the family legacy forward. He was pursuing a PhD in Hindustani classical music when he met with a fatal road accident in New Delhi on 1 September 1994 at the age of 27. Meeta, who was pursuing her bachelor's degree at the time and preparing for an MBA, decided to take up the cudgels of carrying on the legacy and went on to pursue her masters in music. She completed her PhD in the Hindustani Classical music by the age of 27.

Career
Meeta gave her first performance on stage at the age of 9, during a 3-day music festival ‘Prasang’ organized by her grandfather, Pt. Krishnarao Shankar Pandit at Bharat Bhawan, Bhopal. At the age of 15, she performed at the Sankat Mochan festival in Varanasi, one of India's biggest annual classical music and dance festival. She has performed at almost all the major classical music festivals of India and abroad which include the prestigious Sawai Gandharva Bhimsen Festival in 1999 and 2014, the Dover Lane Music Conference, Kolkata in 2013 and 2019 and the Tansen Samaroh, Gwalior in 2011,2013 and 2019 . 

Other notable performances :

India International Centre (2011 & 2014)
 Nadaneerajanam, as a part of Tirumala Tirupati Devasthanam
WOMADelaide, New Zealand and Australia
Melbourne Recital Centre (2015)
Darbar festival, Milton Court Concert Hall, London (2018), United Kingdom
 MERU Concert (2012, 2015) Netherlands
 Ram Marathe Smruti Sangeet Samaroh, Thane (2017)
 Pt. Jitendra Abhisheki Music Festival, Kala Academy, Goa
 Pancham Group, Satara
 Pracheen Kala Kendra, Chandigarh (2016)
 Bagri Foundation, London (2015)
 Ustad Alladiya Khan Sangeet Samaroh, Chembur, Mumbai (2015)
 ViViDa Sangeet Sammelan, Pune (2013)
National Centre for the Performing Arts, Mumbai
Swarzankar, Pune
 Pt. Sharatchandra Arolkar Smruti Sangeet Samaroh – Khayal Trust, Mumbai
Harballabh Sangeet Sammelan, Jalandhar, Punjab (1998 and 2015)
 Shri Bhaini Sahib, Satguru Jagjit Singh Sangeet Sammelan (2017)
 C.R. Vyas Sangeet Samaroh, Vadodara (2015)
 Saptak Music Festival, Ahmedabad
 Ustad Shaik Dawood Tabla Trust, Hyderabad
 Soorya Festival, Trivandrum, Kerala
 Krishna Gaan Sabha, Chennai (2013 and 2015)
 Delhi Classical Music Festival (2013)
 Thumri Festival, Delhi (2017)
 West Bengal State Music Academy Music Festival, Kolkata (2017)
 Jnana Pravaha Music Festival, Birla Sabhagar, organized by Sangeet Ashram, Kolkata (2011)
 Strauss Reflected with David Murphy, John Suchet and Sinfonia Verdi at Cadogan Hall, London (2017)
 Bharat Sanskriti Yatra, Stein Auditorium, India Habitat Centre, New Delhi
 Madhya Pradesh Diwas, organized by the Government of Madhya Pradesh, Bhopal (2018)
 'Aadya', Bharat Bhavan, Bhopal (2017)
 ' Swara- Music for Life', organized by Banyan Tree Events, Jaipur (2015)
 De Meervaart, Netherlands
Zee Jaipur Literature Festival, Jaipur (2018)
 SaMaPa Sangeet Sammelan, New Delhi and Jammu (2015)
 'Sapthak', Bangalore
Akashwani Sangeet Sammelan
Shimla Classical Music Festival
Chowdhury House Music Conference, Kolkata (2019)
INK Conference, Jaisalmer, Rajasthan (2019)
Adab-E-Mausiqui -Patna Literature Festival, Patna, Bihar (2019)
Gala Concert, Shanghai Cooperation Organisation Summit (SCO), Bishkek, Kyrgyzstan (2019)

1995–2000
Between 1995 and 2005, Meeta performed extensively in prestigious festivals in India and abroad in France, Germany, London, Switzerland, Norway, Rome, United States, Russia and Bangladesh.

Through a special project by French Embassy in New Delhi, she stayed in Paris for three months as an "Artist in Residence" in 2003. There she collaborated with the Jazz pianist, Allie Delfau, as a part of an Indo-French project.

She represented India as the Cultural Ambassador of India to Pakistan during the South Asian Association For Regional Co-Operation (SAARC) Summit in Islamabad in 2004.

The Public Service Broadcasting Trust and Prasar Bharati made a film titled – "Meeta: Linking a Tradition with Today” – which documents her life and growth as a singer in 2005.

2005–2019
In 2008, Meeta presented a music appreciation series called "Swar Shringar" on World Space Satellite Radio.

She collaborated with Amsterdam based Tabla player, Heiko Dijker on an album called "The Luminance Project". This album was launched in 2012.

Since 2009, she has been a consultant with Indira Gandhi National Centre for the Arts, New Delhi, a premier government-funded arts organization in India. Among other things, she is involved in a project archiving more than 60 living maestros representing different genres and gharanas of Hindustani Classical music.

Meeta sings in different genres such as bhajan, thumri, tappa and ghazal and has proved her mastery over khayal and tappa. She actively promotes Indian Classical music worldwide. She has also been actively coaching budding singers from India and abroad in her attempt to spread Indian Classical Music globally. She often performs for SPIC MACAY in various schools and colleges to ignite an interest of Indian Classical Music in students.

Awards

Before 2005
 The 'Golden Voice of India' by the Singers Society of India – 1989
 'Sur Mani' by Sur Singar Samsad – 1992
 'Excellence in Music' Award: by Lady Shri Ram College – 1995
 'Full Circle Inner Flame Award', Full Circle Publishing Pvt. Ltd, 1999. (Awarded by I.K Gujral)
 'Yuva Ratna' – Youth Excellence Award by Rotaract Club – 1999
 'Sur Mayank' – Pt. Nikhil Banerjee Smriti Award: Sangeet Bhavan (Lucknow) – 2001
 'Yuva Ojaswini Award' – 2005

2006–2015
 FICCI Young Achiever Award for Indian classical music for 2007.
 Bismillah Khan Award by Sangeet Natak Academy for 2007
 Delhi Ratna – Art and Cultural Trust of India – 2009
 Art Karat Award for her contribution to the field of music – 2013
 SaMaPa Yuva Ratna award for contribution to Classical Music – 2015
 Bhav Bhaveshwar Rashtriya Samman −2015
 JP Award −2017, instituted by the Loknayak Jaiprakash International Studies Centre, New Delhi.

Discography
 Raga Rang (Saregama)
 Arpan (Underscore Records)
 Young Maestros (Underscore Records and Musictoday) 
 The Luminance Project (EMI Virgin)
 Gharana Aur Parampara (Gwalior Gharana) – Vol 1 (Prasar Bharti and Doordarshan)
 Gharana Aur Parampara (Gwalior Gharana) – Vol 2 (Prasar Bharti and Doordarshan)

References

1974 births
Living people
Indian women classical singers
Women musicians from Delhi
Singers from Delhi
20th-century Indian singers
20th-century Indian women singers
21st-century Indian singers
21st-century Indian women singers